The Whitecap Mountains is a ski resort located in the town of Anderson, Iron County, Wisconsin (postal address Upson, Wisconsin, and located west of Montreal, Wisconsin). It has a  vertical drop with 43 ski trails which are serviced by nine lifts. The mountains are nestled in the ancient and picturesque Penokee Mountain Range just 16 miles off of the southern Lake Superior shoreline. The terrain is diverse enough to accommodate skiers of all difficulty levels.

Whitecap is traditionally known as the home of the "Chinese Downhill" competition in the late 80's, with rumors that this tradition would be revived (with increased safety measures). The race has been known to be a significant career booster, with high level executives from NCR, Modine and Williams having been participants. The resort was lovingly managed on a shoestring by Dave and Evie Lundberg from 1964 to 2018, when it was sold after the passing of Dave Lundberg. In January, 2019, the main lodge suffered a devastating fire which the new owners are pledging to rebuild.

Notes

External links
Whitecap Mountains website
Review of Whitecap Mountains
All things North Western Wisconsin and Upper Peninsula

Geography of Iron County, Wisconsin
Ski areas and resorts in Wisconsin
Tourist attractions in Iron County, Wisconsin